The history of rugby union matches between Argentina and Ireland is one of a very even contest and significant mutual rivalry, a rivalry increased by a series of notable meetings at the Rugby World Cup. 

, the sides have met twenty four times with a result of fifteen wins to Ireland, eight to Argentina and one drawn game; however, five of these matches were not a fully test capped match for Ireland. At the end of the 2010 Autumn Internationals there was only a nineteen-point difference in cumulative points scored. The largest winning margin of 23 points for Argentina was recorded in the meeting of their 2015 Rugby World Cup quarter-final, when Argentina won by 43 points to 20. Ireland's largest winning margin is 46 points, which occurred in November 2021.  

Argentina have yet to beat Ireland on Irish soil, and Ireland have only won twice in Argentina. Ireland's first win against Argentina was in 1952, however it was only a capped match for Argentina. Ireland's first fully test capped away win in Argentina came in 2014. Since 2012 matches between the two teams have been held for the Admiral Brown Cup. Argentina first won the Cup in 2015; since 2018 it has been held by Ireland.

In the nineteen matches since 1990 which are counted as full internationals by both sides, Argentina have won six times and Ireland thirteen times. The five matches played between 1952 and 1973 are not regarded as full internationals by Ireland,  but are by Argentina; in these matches each side has two wins, with one match drawn.

Summary
Note: Summary below reflects test results by both teams.

Overall

Records
Note: Date shown in brackets indicates when the record was or last set.

Attendance
Up to date as of 1 March 2023

Results
Note: non-Argentine/Irish stadiums are listed in brackets:

Non-test results 
Below is a list of matches that Argentina has awarded matches test match status by virtue of awarding caps, but Ireland did not award caps.

List of series

References

 
Argentina national rugby union team matches
Ireland national rugby union team matches
Rugby union rivalries in Argentina
Rugby union rivalries in Ireland